The Patriotic Traitors: A History of Collaboration in German-Occupied Europe, 1940–45 is a 1972 book by David Littlejohn.  It is a history of the Europeans who took part in collaborationism with Nazi Germany.  Individual chapters are devoted to Norway, Denmark, the Netherlands, Belgium, France, and the Soviet Union.

Reception
Littlejohn was later criticized for this book in the work The Kings and the Pawns, where Leonid Rein stated that it was wrong to "attribute all collaboration during World War II to fascist and fascist-like parties".

See also
Non-Germans in the German armed forces during World War II
Wehrmacht foreign volunteers and conscripts
Waffen-SS foreign volunteers and conscripts

References

1972 non-fiction books
History books about Nazi Germany
History books about World War II
History books about Norway
History books about Denmark
History books about the Netherlands
History books about Belgium
History books about France
History books about the Soviet Union
20th-century history books
Heinemann (publisher) books